The American Sportscasters Association (ASA) was founded in 1979 by broadcaster Dick London (Hanna) and associate attorney Harold Foner as a non-profit association to represent sportscasters by promoting and supporting the needs and interests of the professional sports broadcaster.

History
In 1980, Louis O. Schwartz was asked to revitalize the association by founders Dick London (award-winning broadcast journalist) and (Attorney) Harold Foner and was named executive director. In 1983, a board of directors was established consisting of Jack Brickhouse, Don Dunphy, Dick Enberg, Curt Gowdy and Schwartz. Enberg was elected as chairman and Schwartz as president.

In 1974, Baseball Commissioner Bowie Kuhn's office asked founder, Dick London, to form the Baseball Broadcasters Association of America. This was accomplished with the help of Joe Rickler and Monti Irvin from the Commissioner's Office. A few years later he formed the American Sportscasters Association, the umbrella organization for all sportscasters. After his retirement in 2000, Dick continued to perform on radio and TV. For two years he co-hosted a Sunday pre-game sports show covering all NFL games on KDUS Radio, Phoenix, the voice of the Arizona Cardinals, as well as weekly news and commentary. He also moderated the panel show "Air It Out With The Bad Boys" until the spring of 2008. Since 2008, Dick has been off the mic writing books, including "A Peaceful War," a modern historical novel, and others about his life experiences.

Dick London's career as a print, radio and television broadcast journalist spanned 46 years. In the military, he was the public relations representative for President Eisenhower's Committee for Hungarian Refugee Relief. He received the First Army Award for humanitarian and outstanding service. He was a regular guest on NBC-Monitor, ABC, CBS, BBC and Radio Free Europe. He also produced a military Christmas show with singer Steve Lawrence on WNDT-TV in New York City. After the military, he was the TV News Anchor for a CBS-TV affiliate in Pennsylvania. That was followed by news anchor positions on WWRL/WRFM in New York City, where he became News and Sports Director before WRFM was sold to Bonneville. WWRL was the nation's number one R&B station. Under his leadership, the news team won several civic and national journalism awards including the prestigious Peabody. In 1976, one of the world's top survey organizations, The Lou Harris Company, said Dick's leadership position in New York State made his opinion particularly important to us. Other credits include his nightly half-hour world news round-up on WNYW, the CBS international affiliate, and his news anchor position at WNBC. Dick wrote many articles on social issues for religious organizations, including The National Catholic Register, The American Baptist Educational Ministries and the National Council of Churches. Dick has post Graduate Degrees in Broadcast Journalism and Media from CUNY, and NYU (Gallatin Division).

Halls of fame

In 1984, Schwartz established the ASA Hall of Fame to honor those who have achieved excellence in the field of sports broadcasting. Inductees include:

1984 – Red Barber
1984 – Don Dunphy
1985 – Curt Gowdy
1984 – Ted Husing
1984 – Graham McNamee
1984 – Bill Stern
1985 – Mel Allen
1985 – Jack Brickhouse
1986 – Lindsey Nelson
1987 – Clem McCarthy
1987 – Jim McKay
1989 – Harry Caray
1990 – Jack Buck
1991 – Ernie Harwell
1992 – Vin Scully
1993 – Howard Cosell
1993 – Marty Glickman
1994 – Keith Jackson
1995 – Chick Hearn
1996 – Chris Schenkel
1997 – Pat Summerall
1997 – Jack Whitaker
1998 – Ray Scott

In 1987, the association established an International Hall of Fame. Its first inductee was Masao Hazama, one of Japan's first television sports broadcasters. Other inductees include BBC Sport boxing correspondent Harry Carpenter (1989) and Song Shixiong, sports commentator for China Central Television (CCTV) for over 30 years (1995).

Recognizing sportcasters and notable individuals
A "Sportscaster of the Year" award has also been given to top sportscasters, including Marv Albert, Chris Berman, Bob Costas, John Madden and Al Michaels.

The association has also recognized sports greats and other notable individuals who have influenced society and the world of sports, including Muhammad Ali, Arthur Ashe, Joe DiMaggio, Larry King, Henry Kissinger, LeRoy Neiman, and U.S. President Ronald Reagan

Events
It has had fourteen Hall of Fame dinners with over 500 attendees at each one.

Board of directors
, its board of directors included Enberg, Jon Miller, Jim Nantz, Schwartz and Bill Walton.

See also
National Sports Media Association

References

A Peaceful War by Dick London and Winston Hodge - https://www.amazon.com/Peaceful-War-Winston-Hodge-ebook/dp/B008Y5J4QE
A Peaceful War (audio book) by Richard Hanna (Dick "Hanna" London) - https://itunes.apple.com/us/audiobook/a-peaceful-war-unabridged/id582862842

Dick London News Director for WWRL 1600 NY, NY - http://www.las-solanas.com/arsa/surveys_item.php?svid=2357

External links
 American Sportscasters Association official website

1979 establishments in the United States
American sports journalism organizations
Sports organizations established in 1979
Sports television in the United States
Sports organizations of the United States
Trade associations based in the United States
Organizations based in New York City